East Vineland is an unincorporated community located within Buena Vista Township in Atlantic County, New Jersey, United States.

Demographics

References

Buena Vista Township, New Jersey
Unincorporated communities in Atlantic County, New Jersey
Unincorporated communities in New Jersey